The sixth series of Made in Chelsea, a British structured-reality television programme, began airing on 14 October 2013 on E4. The series concluded on 16 December 2013 after 10 episodes, however a Christmas special episode aired immediately after the series on 23 December 2013, which was then followed by an end of season special presented by Rick Edwards on 30 December 2013 featuring a reunion of the cast to discuss events from the series. This was the first series to feature new cast members Sam Thompson, Sophie Hermann and Stephanie Pratt, and was the final series to feature Olivia Newman-Young, Phoebe-Lettice Thompson, and original cast member Francis Boulle. The series featured the love blossoming between Jamie and Lucy despite obstacles in the form of Spencer and Phoebe, the breakdown of Andy and Louise's relationship as many secrets are revealed, the rivalry between friends Fran and Phoebe as Phoebe discovers Fran has made a pass at her ex-boyfriend, and the start of the relationship for Alex and Binky.

Cast

Episodes

{| class="wikitable plainrowheaders" style="width:100%; background:white;"
|- style="color:white"
! style="background: #A1A1A1;"| SeriesNo.
! style="background: #A1A1A1;"| EpisodeNo.
! style="background: #A1A1A1;"| Title
! style="background: #A1A1A1;"| Original airdate
! style="background: #A1A1A1;"| Duration
! style="background: #A1A1A1;"| UK viewers

|}

Ratings

External links

References

2013 British television seasons
Made in Chelsea seasons